G. Dhananjayan is an Indian film producer, columnist, and author of four books on Indian films. He has produced films in the Tamil, Telugu, Malayalam and Hindi languages, including Sankat City (2009), Kanden Kadhalai (2009), Mugamoodi (2012), Anjaan (2014) and Irudhi Suttru (2016). He has written as a columnist for Galatta Cinema, The Hindu Tamil and The Times of India. He has won two National Film Awards.

Education and work 

G. Dhananjayan holds an MBA degree from Sydenham Institute of Management SIMSREE, University of Mumbai (1991 batch) and earned his Ph.D from Mumbai University for his thesis on the Indian Film Industry in March 2019.

He worked in Asian Paints Ltd, Kansai Nerolac Paints, Saregama, Bharti Airtel and Vodafone for more than 15 years before joining Moser Baer Entertainment in 2006. Dhananjayan was the company's Chief Operating Officer of Home Video Business and then Chief Executive Officer of the Film Business.

GD was one of the two founding members of Moser Baer Entertainment in April 2006. Within a span of 6 months, GD acquired the copyright/marketing rights for over 10,000 film titles in ten languages, including Hindi, Tamil, Telugu, Kannada, Malayalam, Bengali, Marathi, Gujarati, Punjabi to launch DVDs and VCDs under the banner of Moser Baer. This allows competition with unauthorised copies of DVDs typically sold for very low prices.

GD was associated with UTV Motion Pictures (now called Disney-India) since January 2011 till February 2016 and was instrumental in producing number of films in South.

GD spends considerable time in interacting with students of various Film Institutes across India. He also delivered speeches at IIT, NIT and other management institutes on film business. GD is invited to various forums and programs to speak on film business, management and many other topics. GD also pursues speaking in All India Radio on public interest topics on many occasions and participates in several Television channel debates on Cinema.

GD has also made documentaries on legendary filmmakers. His first documentary on Producer-Director-Writer Panchu Arunachalam titled 'A Creator with Midas Touch' which was selected and screened at Indian Panorama of International Film Festival, Goa (2016) received widespread appreciation. His second documentary on legendary directors Krishnan–Panju was selected and screened at Mumbai International Film Festival (2017) received critical acclaim.

Movie production 

At Moser Baer Entertainment GD ventured into film production with "Shaurya" in Hindi and "Vellitherai" in Tamil.  Moser Baer then produced "Sankat City" and "Hide & Seek" in Hindi, "Raman Thediya Seethai", "Poo", "Abhiyum Naanum","Kanden Kadhalai", "Aval Peyar Thamizharasi" and "Siddhu +2" with K. Bhagyaraj in Tamil and "Kaana Kanmani" in Malayalam in a span of two years.

At UTV Motion Pictures (now called Disney-India) GD had acquired and also produced films in Tamil and Malayalam. The first film, UTV marketed after his joining was Deiva Thirumagal which was a critically acclaimed movie. He was involved in producing, marketing and distributing films. Under his supervision UTV had co-produced in Tamil "Vettai" and Vazhakku Enn 18/9 with Director N. Lingusamy's Thirrupathi Brothers, Kalakalappu  and "Theeya Velai Seiyyanum Kumaru" with Sundar C's Avni Cinemax, M.Saravanan—Vikram Prabhu' Ivan Veramathiri and Suriya's Anjaan with Director N. Lingusamy's Thirrupathi Brothers, and "Naan Sigappu Manithan" with Vishal Film Factory. GD had produced under UTV banner "Muran", "Mugamoodi" ,"Thaandavam","Settai","Sigaram Thodu", Director S.P.Jhananathan—Arya-Vijay Sethupathi's "Purampokku" and Director Vishnuvaradhan—Arya's "Yatchan" in Tamil. In Malayalam UTV had produced "Grandmaster" and "Husbands in Goa". In his last assignment with UTV, GD was involved in the marketing of Director Sudha Kongara and Madhavan's “Irudhi Suttru" in 2016.

GD is currently an independent consulting film producer and distributor. In 2018 he produced Tamil films Mr. Chandramouli by Thiru (director), starring Karthik (actor), Gautham Karthik, Regina Cassandra, Varalaxmi Sarathkumar, Santhosh Prathap and others and Kaatrin Mozhi by Radha Mohan, starring Jyothika, Vidharth, Lakshmi Manchu and others.

GD is known for his full involvement while producing the film with his director and observes carefully the way the movie is moulding in-shape without setbacks. Director Cheran once mentioned in an interview that producers should be like GD by visiting the shooting spots and being a part of the production process, so that they will know what hurdles the film crew is facing while making a movie.

Movie Distribution 

GD has distributed the film “Zero" in 2016 under his production banner Blue Ocean Entertainment. In May 2017, he commenced his distribution company Creative Entertainers and Distributors and distributed the successful film “Ivan Thanthiran". In 2018 GD distributed the film U Turn starring Samantha Prabhu in Tamil Nadu, which became a success.

GD's recently distributed film is "Kolaigaran"  which was released on June 7, 2019  and "Kavalthurai Ungal Nanban" which got released on November 27, 2020. Both the films were commercial successes.

Writing career 

GD is passionate about writing and has contributed several articles to Times of India, The Hindu Tamil, Dinathanthi Next, Deccan Chronicle, Indian Management, DNA, India Today and other publications.

GD has written a book about Tamil cinema titled The Best of Tamil Cinema: 1931 to 2010, in English, which was released by Legendary Actor Kamal Haasan on 2 March 2011 in the presence of eminent film makers. Super Star Rajinikanth personally appreciated the book by giving a memento for the fantastic research and writing on Tamil cinema. The book has reached out to many universities worldwide and has become a reference point on Tamil cinema for many interested foreigners to know about Tamil cinema.

GD's second book was "Pride of Tamil Cinema", released in 2014.  The book was released at Indian Panorama, Goa in 2014 and it went on to win the National Award (Special Mention) for Best Writing on Cinema for the year 2014. The book is highly appreciated by the film industry for the impeccable documentation of the films.

GD's monthly column in 'Galatta Cinema' for two years was widely read by eminent personalities in South Indian Cinema and was appreciated for his professional contribution to South Cinema. His article series in Tamil newspaper 'The Hindu' was widely read and appreciated for the valuable contribution he is doing by enlightening the readers on the happenings in Tamil cinema and the changes required. His collection of Tamil articles was published by 'The Hindu' under the title ‘Vellithirayin Vetri Manthirangal’ which is today one of the best sellers from their publication.

GD's fourth book titled 'The Art and Business of Cinema(ABC)' was released in December 2017 comprising nearly 100 articles that explains the various art and business facets of cinema. The collection of articles in this book is a must read for interested filmmakers to understand the challenges in the industry and what to keep in mind to deliver a film successfully.

GD's series of articles in various newspapers won him his second National Award as the Best Critic of the year 2016.

In 2021, Dhananjayan was named the head of Tamil content and digital business for SonyLIV. In 2023, Dhananjayan and Madhan Karky started a "script bank" to help aspiring screenwriters better research their scripts.

Filmography 
At Moser Baer Entertainment as the Producer or Co-Producer

 Vellithirai (2008)
 Raman Thediya Seethai (2008)
 Poo (2008)
 Sankat City (2009)- Hindi
 Kana Kanmani (2009) – Malayalam
 Kanden Kadhalai (2009)
 Aval Peyar Thamizharasi (2010)
 Siddhu +2 (2010)
 Hide & Seek (2010) – Hindi

Also associated with  Abhiyum Naanum  (2008) and Mayilu (2012) in funding the project to Prakash Raj's Duet Movies.

At Disney-UTV as the Associate Producer

 Deivathirumagal (2011)
 Muran (2011)
 Vettai (2012)
 Kalakalappu (2012)
 Vazhakku Enn 18/9 (2012)
 Grandmaster (2012) – Malayalam
 Husbands in Goa (2012) – Malayalam
 Mugamoodi (2012)
 Thaandavam (2012)
 Settai (2013)
 Theeya Velai Seiyyanum Kumaru (2013)
 Ivan Veramathiri (2013)
 Naan Sigappu Manithan (2014)
 Anjaan (2014)
 Sigaram Thodu (2014)
 Purampokku (2014)
 Yatchan (2015)
 Irudhi Suttru (2016)

As Producer – Creative Entertainers
Mr. Chandramouli (2018)
Kaatrin Mozhi (2018)
Kabadadaari (2021)
Kapatadhaari (2021)

As Actor
Mandhira Punnagai (2010)
Vandhaan Vendraan (2011)
Kathai Thiraikathai Vasanam Iyakkam (2014)
Idhu Namma Aalu (2016)
Utharavu Maharaja (2018)
Boomerang (2019)
Kabadadaari (2021)

As Distributor
Zero (2016)
Ivan Thanthiran (2017)
U Turn (2018)
Kolaigaran (2019)
Kavalthurai Ungal Nanban (2020)

Documentary films

 A Creator with Midas Touch (documentary on Panchu Arunachalam)
 The Pioneering Duo (documentary on Krishnan–Panju)

Books 
Best of Tamil Cinema: 1931 to 2010 (2 Volumes)
Pride of Tamil Cinema: 1931–2013
Vellithirayin Vetri Manthirangal (in Tamil)
The Art and Business of Cinema (ABC)

Awards 
 2015: National Film Award for Best Book on Cinema (Special Mention) – Pride of Tamil Cinema (1931–2013)
2017: National Film Award for Best Film Critic

References

External links 
 Rediff.com – Interview
 IndiaGlitz
 Sify
 Banglore mirror – Interview

Living people
Film producers from Chennai
1965 births
Tamil film producers
Indian film historians
Indian chief operating officers
Best Critic National Film Award winners
Telugu film producers